Styelin A is an antibiotic peptide isolated from Styela clava.

Notes

Antibiotics